The Wilmès II Government was a minority Federal Government of Belgium, led by Prime Minister Sophie Wilmès, the first female Prime Minister of Belgium. 

Wilmès had been selected as a caretaker Prime Minister following the 2019 Belgian federal election, and headed the Wilmès I Government, a minority government with the same party composition as the previous Michel II Government, from 27 October 2019. 

On 17 March 2020, the opposition parties sp.a, PS, Groen, Ecolo, cdH and DéFI agreed to give Wilmès the plenary powers needed to deal with the coronavirus outbreak in Belgium, for a period of three months. This was later extended until mid-September 2020, and then 1 October 2020, to allow completion of the 2019–20 Belgian government formation. Upon the end of the process, the Wilmès II Government was replaced by the De Croo Government.

Composition
The composition of the government was identical to that of the last composition of Wilmès I Government.

References

Belgian governments
2020 establishments in Belgium
2020 disestablishments in Belgium
Cabinets established in 2020
Cabinets disestablished in 2020